Yousef Ahmed Al-Thodan (born February 9, 1989) is a Jordanian football player who plays as a central midfielder for the Jordan national football team.

International career
Al-Thodan's first international match with the Jordan national senior team was against Colombia on June 7, 2014 when Colombia won 3-0.

References

External links 
 
 goal.com 
 kooora.com
 

Living people
Jordan international footballers
Jordanian expatriate footballers
Expatriate footballers in Saudi Arabia
Al-Ramtha SC players
Al-Orobah FC players
Hajer FC players
1989 births
Jordanian footballers
Footballers at the 2010 Asian Games
Al-Arabi (Jordan) players
Al-Sareeh SC players
Ettifaq FC players
Al-Shoulla FC players
Al-Hejaz Club players
Saudi Second Division players
Saudi First Division League players
Association football midfielders
Asian Games competitors for Jordan